Dean Stuart Hoffman (born 13 January 1966) is a former English cricketer. Hoffman was a right-handed batsman who bowled right-arm medium-fast. He was born at Erdington, Warwickshire.

Hoffman made his first-class debut for Warwickshire against Surrey in 1985. During the 1985 season he represented the county in 17 first-class matches, the last of which came against Essex in the County Championship. In his 17 first-class matches for Warwickshire, he scored 39 runs at a poor batting average of 3.54, with a high score of 13*. With the ball he took 29 wickets at a bowling average of 40.00, with best figures of 4/100.

It was for Warwickshire that Hoffman made his debut in List A cricket against Somerset. During the 1985 season he played 11 List A matches, the last of which came against Worcestershire. With the ball he took 7 wickets at a bowling average of 50.28, with best figures of 2/18.

In 1988, he played a single first-class match for Northamptonshire against the touring West Indians.

The following season he made his Minor Counties Championship debut for Cambridgeshire against Suffolk. He represented the county in 5 Minor Counties Championship matches during the 1989 season, playing his final Championship match for the county against Hertfordshire. He played 2 MCCA Knockout Trophy matches in 1989 against Suffolk and Bedfordshire. In 1989 he represented the county in a single List A match against Worcestershire in the 1989 NatWest Trophy. The 1989 season was his last in county cricket.

References

External links
Dean Hoffman at Cricinfo

1966 births
Living people
Cricketers from Birmingham, West Midlands
English cricketers
Warwickshire cricketers
Northamptonshire cricketers
Cambridgeshire cricketers
English cricketers of 1969 to 2000